Thirunaal is a 2016 Indian Tamil-language action drama film written and directed by P. S. Ramnath and produced by M. Senthil Kumar. The film stars Jiiva and Nayanthara in their second collaboration after E. The music was composed by Srikanth Deva. The film was released on 5 August 2016.

Plot
"Blade" Ganesh (Jiiva) is a henchman for a local don Naaga (Sharath Lohitashwa) and is loyal to him without any reason. Blade is ready to go to any extent for the sake of Naaga. However, Naaga views Blade just as a henchman and uses him to run his local mafia. Vithya (Nayanthara) is the daughter of a local factory owner (Joe Malloori) who is also a friend of Naaga. She falls for Ganesh after he saves her from a few goons. Vithya's father arranges her wedding with another man, but everyone learns about the love affair between Vithya and Blade, which creates animosity between Naaga and Vithya's father. Naaga does not want Blade to marry anyone as he fears that Blade might leave him post-marriage, which could weaken his mafia business. Blade overhears Naaga's conversation and understands his true intentions and feels bad for blindly trusting Naaga all these days leading to his transformation into a good human being.

Vithya's father decides to move out of town with family and asks Naaga to return the money which he owes, but Naaga refuses and betrays Vithya's father. Blade comes to his rescue and with his help, Vithya's father complains in a police station following which Naaga returns the money. Naaga decides to kill Blade for moving away from him. Vithya's father understands Blade's transformation and agrees to get Vithya married to him. On the day before Blade's wedding, Naaga's henchmen hit Blade but is saved. Blade decides to take revenge and kills Naaga, following which he surrenders in court. He is released after a few years and marries Vithya.

Cast

Jiiva as "Blade" Ganesh
Nayantara as Vithya
Sharath Lohitashwa as Naaga
Karunas as Mani
Joe Malloori as Vithya's father
Rama as Vithya's mother
Gopinath as ASP Pugazhenthi
Jangiri Madhumitha as Vithya's driver
Meenakshi as Prema
D. R. K. Kiran as Ganesh's friend
V. I. S. Jayapalan as Durai
Ramdoss as Tips
G. Marimuthu
Sujatha Sivakumar as Vasuki
Ramachandran Durairaj as Naaga's henchman
Thirumurugan
Cheranraj
Sujibala
Usilampatti Perumayi
Supergood Subramani as Principal's friend
Bava Lakshmanan as Nadhaswaram player

Production
The film was first reported in November 2014, when Jiiva had agreed terms to work on a village-centric film directed by P. S. Ramnath, who had previously made Ambasamudram Ambani (2010). Nayanthara signed on to appear in the film in April 2015, while Srikanth Deva was confirmed as the film's music director. The film began its first schedule in Kumbakonam in May 2015 at a grand Agraharam set. The films trailer was released on for Diwali . The shooting for the film was completed by the end of August 2015 and the post production work thereafter started.

Track listing

Lyrics written by Muthu Vijayan.

Reception 
Behindwoods rated the film 1.75 out of 5 stating "Had the film come ten years ago, it might have worked a little better." Baradwaj Rangan of the Hindu called it " Nicely made, but still pretty generic" in his review.

References

External links
 

2016 films
2010s Tamil-language films
Films scored by Srikanth Deva
2016 action drama films
Indian action drama films